Christopher J. Simon (born January 30, 1972) is a Canadian former professional ice hockey left winger, who played 20 seasons of ice hockey: 15 seasons in the NHL and 5 seasons in the Kontinental Hockey League.  He last played for Metallurg Novokuznetsk of the KHL.  Known as an aggressive player, he was suspended eight times for a combined total of 65 games during his NHL career.

Playing career
Simon grew up in Wawa, Ontario, playing his minor hockey for the Wawa Flyers of the NOHA.  As a Bantam, he played Jr.B. hockey for the Sault Ste. Marie Thunderbirds of the NOJHL in 1987–88.  He was selected in the 3rd round (42nd overall) of the 1988 OHL Priority Selection by the Ottawa 67's.

Simon was drafted in the 2nd round (25th overall) of the 1990 NHL Entry Draft by the Philadelphia Flyers, but was traded as part of the Eric Lindros trade to the Quebec Nordiques before playing any games for the Flyers. He has also played for the Calgary Flames, Colorado Avalanche, Washington Capitals, Chicago Blackhawks, New York Rangers where he split the season as a left wing and right wing, New York Islanders and Minnesota Wild.

In 1996, he won the Stanley Cup with the Avalanche. Each player on the winning team is given 24 hours alone with the Cup. Simon took it to his hometown of Wawa, Ontario. After showing it to the townspeople he and his maternal grandfather took the Cup on a fishing trip.

Simon was a member of the Washington Capitals when they went to the Stanley Cup finals in 1998. He had been enjoying great offensive success that season until a shoulder injury knocked him out for much of the playoff run. He underwent season-ending shoulder surgery in December 1998. He was the team's leading goal scorer in the 1999–2000 season with 29 goals in 75 games. He also made it to the Stanley Cup finals with the Calgary Flames in 2004, and played for the Flames for two seasons before being signed as a free agent in 2006 by the New York Islanders and was then traded to the Minnesota Wild for a 6th round draft pick.

Chris Simon is of Ojibwa descent, and was born in Wawa, Ontario.
Chris Simon is seen as a role model to Native Canadians for his accomplishments in the NHL.

Suspensions
Simon was involved in numerous on-ice incidents and was suspended eight times for his conduct, for a grand total of 65 games.

Mike Grier incident
On November 8, 1997, during a game against the Edmonton Oilers, Simon was suspended three games for using his stick to hit Edmonton's Mike Grier. Grier allegedly made derogatory comments about Simon's Ojibwa heritage, and Simon allegedly responded with a racial slur (supposedly calling Grier, who is black, a "nigger") before hitting Grier, although the words spoken between the two players were never confirmed. Simon flew to Toronto to apologize to Grier, who accepted. Grier and Simon were later teammates for a brief time in 2002 with the Washington Capitals.

Ryan Hollweg incident
On March 8, 2007, the Islanders faced the rival New York Rangers, at the Nassau Veterans Memorial Coliseum. At 13:25 of the third period, Rangers forward Ryan Hollweg checked Simon from (what Simon felt was) behind, knocking him face first into the boards, and giving Simon a concussion. No penalty was assessed, and play continued.  Simon then took a two-handed baseball swing in the face of Ryan Hollweg with his hockey stick as he skated by. Simon received a match penalty for attempt to injure, resulting in his ejection from the game. Hollweg suffered a cut to the chin that required two stitches. According to ESPN's Barry Melrose, Hollweg escaped serious injury because Simon's blow caught his shoulder pads before hitting his face.

Simon was automatically suspended indefinitely by the NHL due to his match penalty pending ruling by the league commissioner. On March 11, Simon's suspension was set at a minimum of 25 games, and it continued into the first five games of the 2007–08 season. The Nassau County district attorney considered filing criminal charges against Simon, but declined. Hollweg later told Newsday that he was not interested in pressing charges.

On March 10, Simon issued a statement in which he apologized to Hollweg and the league and said that there is "absolutely no place in hockey" for what he did. He asserted that he did not remember much about the incident because he was "completely out of it" as a result of the concussion.

Jarkko Ruutu incident
On December 15, 2007, at 14:06 of the third period of a home game against Pittsburgh, Tim Jackman and Jarkko Ruutu exchanged words between the teams' benches during a stoppage of play. Simon skated in behind Ruutu and pulled Ruutu's leg back with his own. When Ruutu fell to his knees, Simon stomped on the back of Ruutu's right leg with his skate and then went to the bench. Simon was given a match penalty for attempt to injure and ejected from the game.

The following Monday, Simon agreed to go on indefinite paid leave from the team, saying there was "no excuse" for his actions and that he needed some time away from hockey. However, the next day, Simon was suspended without pay for 30 games, the third-longest suspension for an on-ice incident in modern NHL history behind a 41-game suspension to Raffi Torres in 2015 and a one-year suspension handed down to Marty McSorley in 2000 (though McSorley only sat out 23 games before his contract expired and he left the NHL). League disciplinarian Colin Campbell said that in his opinion, Simon had "repeatedly evidence(d) the lack of ability to control his actions," and also stressed that this was his eighth disciplinary hearing. Following the suspension, Simon returned to play one more game with the New York Islanders before being traded to the Minnesota Wild.

After Chris Pronger was not initially disciplined by the NHL when he stomped on Ryan Kesler's leg in March 2008, Simon decried what he saw as unfair and unequal treatment. On March 15, 2008, the NHL suspended Pronger for 8 games.

Minor incidents
Simon was suspended for one game in a 2000 playoff series against Pittsburgh for cross checking Peter Popovic across the throat on April 13, 2000. He was given two-game suspensions, first on April 5, 2001, for elbowing Anders Eriksson, and twice more in 2004 for cross checking Tampa Bay's Ruslan Fedotenko and then jumping on and punching him, and for kneeing Dallas's Sergei Zubov.

Personal life
His father, John, is of Ojibwe descent from the Wiikwemkoong First Nation on Manitoulin Island. As a teenager, he struggled with an addiction to alcohol but was helped to sobriety by future Buffalo Sabres and New York Islanders coach Ted Nolan in 1992.

Simon was previously married to Lauri Smith. The two divorced and he has four children with his second wife Valerie, divorced in 2017. In 2017, Simon filed for bankruptcy and claimed he is unable to work due to his hockey injuries.

Career statistics

Awards and honours

Transactions
June 30, 1992: Traded by the Philadelphia Flyers, along with Peter Forsberg, Steve Duchesne, Kerry Huffman, Mike Ricci, Ron Hextall, Philadelphia's 1993 1st round draft choice, Philadelphia's 1994 1st round draft choice and $15 million, to the Quebec Nordiques in exchange for Eric Lindros.
June 21, 1995: Rights transferred to the Colorado Avalanche after the Quebec Nordiques relocated.
November 2, 1996: Traded by the Colorado Avalanche, along with Curtis Leschyshyn, to the Washington Capitals in exchange for Keith Jones and Washington's 1998 1st and 4th round draft choices.
November 1, 2002: Traded by the Washington Capitals, along with Andrei Nikolishin, to the Chicago Blackhawks in exchange for Michael Nylander, Chicago's 2003 3rd round draft choice and future considerations.
July 25, 2003: Signed as a free agent with the New York Rangers.
March 6, 2004: Traded by the New York Rangers, along with New York's 2004 7th round draft choice, to the Calgary Flames in exchange for Jamie McLennan, Blair Betts and Greg Moore.
July 11, 2006: Signed as a free agent with the New York Islanders.
February 26, 2008: Traded to the Minnesota Wild for a 6th round pick in the 2008 NHL Entry Draft.
March 27, 2009: Signed a one-year extension with Vityaz Chekhov.
May 3, 2011: released from UHC Dynamo Moscow

References

External links

1972 births
Living people
Calgary Flames players
Canadian ice hockey left wingers
Chicago Blackhawks players
Colorado Avalanche players
First Nations sportspeople
Halifax Citadels players
Metallurg Novokuznetsk players
Ice hockey people from Ontario
Minnesota Wild players
New York Islanders players
New York Rangers players
Ojibwe people
Ottawa 67's players
People from Algoma District
Philadelphia Flyers draft picks
Quebec Nordiques players
Sault Ste. Marie Greyhounds players
Stanley Cup champions
HC Vityaz players
Washington Capitals players
Canadian expatriate ice hockey players in Russia